Aubervilliers–Pantin–Quatre Chemins is a station of the Paris Métro. It is at the crossroads of the Roman road that led from Lutetia to east Flanders (now the N2) and the road between the communes of Aubervilliers and Pantin.

History 
Aubervilliers–Pantin–Quatre Chemins opened on 4 October 1979 as part of an extension from Porte de la Villette to Fort d'Aubervilliers.

In 2019, the station was used by 7,215,915 passengers, making it the 37th busiest of the Métro network, out of 302 stations.

In 2020, the station was used by 4,131,018 passengers amidst the COVID-19 pandemic, making it the 27th busiest of the Métro network, out of 305 stations.

Passenger services

Access 
The station has 5 entrances along avenue de la République and avenue Jean-Jaurès.

Station layout

Platforms 
The station has a standard configuration with 2 tracks surrounded by 2 side platforms.

Other connections 
The station is also served by lines 150, 152, 170, and 249 of the RATP bus network, and at night, by line N42 of the Noctilien bus network.

Nearby 
 Église Sainte-Marthe des Quatre-Chemins

Gallery

References

Roland, Gérard (2003). Stations de métro. D’Abbesses à Wagram. Éditions Bonneton.

Paris Métro stations in Aubervilliers
Railway stations in France opened in 1979